HMS Sappho was a  sloop, of the Royal Navy, built by Wigram & Sons, Blackwall and launched on 20 November 1873.

She was placed under the command of Commander Noel Stephen Fox Digby and commenced service at the Australian station in December 1874.

In May 1877 she was at Tonga when the tsunami from the Iquique earthquake struck the islands. The natives blamed her for bringing the tsunami.

In August 1877, still under Digby, she participated in the search for the missing crew and passengers of the Queen Bee that had run aground on Farewell Spit, New Zealand. She successfully found the missing third mate whom she took to Nelson. While at Nelson, her crew participated in a number of fund raising concerts for those shipwrecked.

She left the Australia Station in August 1878 and returned to England.

Sappho commenced service on the Pacific Station in 1881 until 1886 whereupon she returned to England and was paid off.

Fate
She was sold for scrap in December 1887.

Citations

Bibliography

Bastock, John (1988), Ships on the Australia Station, Child & Associates Publishing Pty Ltd; Frenchs Forest, Australia. 

 

 

1873 ships
Ships built by the Blackwall Yard
Victorian-era sloops of the United Kingdom
Fantome-class sloops